The 2003 Tokyo Gubernatorial elections were held on 13 April 2003. Incumbent governor Shintaro Ishihara was re-elected with the support of the Liberal Democratic Party, which was riding a nationwide wave of popularity under Prime Minister Junichiro Koizumi. Opposition parties had billed the election as a referendum regarding Japanese support for the Iraq War. Although endorsed by the LDP, Ishihara's landslide victory was partly owed to the popularity of policies he enacted in opposition to the national government, such as stricter pollution controls.

Results

References 

  平成15年都知事選挙 開票結果
  ザ・選挙 -選挙情報-

2003 elections in Japan
Shintaro Ishihara
2003
April 2003 events in Japan
2003 in Tokyo